Auntie Anne's is an American franchised chain of pretzel shops founded by Anne F. Beiler and her husband, Jonas, in 1988. Auntie Anne's serves products such as pretzels, dips, and beverages. They also offer Pretzels & More Homemade Baking Mix for those who want to make their pretzels at home. The chain has more than 1,200 locations around various locations, such as in shopping malls and outlet malls, as well as non-traditional retail spaces including universities, parking/rest areas, airports, train stations, travel plazas, amusement parks, and military bases. Their slogan as of 2010 is "Pretzel Perfect".

History

The chain started as a market stand in the Downingtown, Pennsylvania, Farmer's Market in 1988. The franchise began when a store location opened at Saturday's Market in Middletown, Pennsylvania. Auntie Anne's celebrated their 100th store opening in Granite Run Mall, Media, Pennsylvania, in 1992. In 1995, the first train station location opened at Penn Station in New York City. This year also brought the opening of the first international Auntie Anne's store in Jakarta, Indonesia.

In October 2006, it was announced that the Auntie Anne's corporate headquarters would be relocated from the town of Gap, Pennsylvania, to downtown Lancaster. The building maintains the original 1920s features such as brass doors, high ceilings, and skylights. The Lancaster Post Office was listed on the National Register of Historic Places in 1982.

In November 2010, Atlanta franchisor Focus Brands, a portfolio company of private equity firm Roark Capital, acquired Auntie Anne's. William P. Dunn Jr. was the company's president and its chief operating officer from 2013 to 2015. Heather Leed Neary became the company's president in 2015.

International locations
Auntie Anne's now has over 600 international locations, including many across Europe, namely the United Kingdom. Locations in Asia include Brunei, Cambodia, India, Indonesia, Malaysia, Philippines, Saudi Arabia, South Korea, Singapore, Taiwan, Thailand and Vietnam, while in the Americas there are sites in Costa Rica and Trinidad and Tobago. There are plans to start stores in China.

In overseas markets, the restaurants have made significant alterations to coexist with local sensibilities, including changing recipes to conform to halal in Malaysia.

Community service and charitable activity
From 1999 through 2009, Auntie Anne's and its franchisees partnered to donate more than $4.5 million to local children's hospitals across the country through the Children's Miracle Network. Auntie Anne's has also supported the pediatric cancer charity Alex's Lemonade Stand Foundation since 2011.

Auntie Anne's began a partnership with Food Donation Connection in 2011, matching stores throughout the country with local hunger relief organizations to donate extra pretzel products.

In 2013, Anne and Auntie Anne's was featured in the reality TV series Food Court Wars. Auntie Anne's founder Anne Beiler appeared in the 2013 season premier of the television show The Secret Millionaire in which she masqueraded as a volunteer at the Baltimore-based food non-profit organization Moveable Feast. She also made a donation to the charity.

See also 
 List of food companies

References

External links

 Official website
 Corporate History of Auntie Anne's
 Auntie Anne's Official UK and Ireland website

1988 establishments in Pennsylvania
2010 mergers and acquisitions
American companies established in 1988
Bakeries of the United States
Companies based in Lancaster, Pennsylvania
Culture of Lancaster, Pennsylvania
Fast-food chains of the United States
Fast-food franchises
Pretzels
Privately held companies based in Pennsylvania
Restaurant chains in the United States
Restaurants established in 1988